Highway Queen is the third studio album by American outlaw country singer Nikki Lane. It was released on February 17, 2017 on New West Records.

Background and recording 

Lane's previous album All or Nothin' suggests a more hipster side of her musical style. With the release of her third studio album, her traditional Americana styles are showcased. Lane co-produced the album with Jonathan Tyler, from Jonathan Tyler and the Northern Light.

Commercial performance
The album has sold 8,300 copies in the United States as of May 2017.

Highway Queen was the 3rd most played americana album in 2017 according to the Americana Music Association's official Airplay Chart, coming in behind The Nashville Sound by Jason Isbell and From A Room: Volume 1 by Chris Stapleton.

Track listing 
Taken from AllMusic

Personnel 

Adapted from AllMusic.

 Ryan Ake – guitar, electric guitar, rhythm guitar
 Ricardo Alessio – package design
 Kim Buie – A&R
 Greg Calbi – mastering
 Justin Collins – assistant engineer
 Shelly Colvin – vocal harmony, background vocals
 Steven Cooper – acoustic guitar, electric guitar
 Daniel Creamer – keyboards, percussion, background vocals
 Collin Dupuis – engineer, mixing, percussion, producer
 Ben Eyestone – drums
 Ian Fitchuk – piano
 Josh Hedley – fiddle
 Ricky Ray Jackson – electric guitar, pedal steel
 Nikki Lane – rhythm guitar, primary artist, producer, vocals, background vocals
 Lee Foster – executive producer
 Scott Lee – bass guitar
 John McTigue – drums
 Alex Muñoz – guitar, baritone guitar
 Russ Pahl – pedal steel
 Matt Pence – drums, engineer, percussion, producer
 Taylor Powell – tambourine
 Dave Roe – bass guitar
 Jeff Saenz – acoustic guitar
 Eden Tyler – photography
 Jonathan Tyler – acoustic guitar, producer, background vocals
 Kenny Vaughan – guitar, acoustic guitar, rhythm guitar
 Eric Whitman – bass guitar, piano
 Erika Wolf – background vocals

References 



2017 albums
Nikki Lane albums
New West Records albums